An election for the leadership of Likud was held on 31 January 2012.

Background
Incumbent Benjamin Netanyahu was expected from the beginning, failing a political crisis to run for re-election. Silvan Shalom and Moshe Feiglin were touted as potential candidates to oppose Netanyahu. However, Shalom declined to run. On 29 December 2011, Feiglin announced his candidacy.

Candidates
 Moshe Feiglin, leader of Manhigut Yehudit faction
 Benjamin Netanyahu, incumbent and Prime Minister of Israel

Declined
 Silvan Shalom

Other
 Vladimir Herczberg, nuclear physicist and perennial candidate - attempted to run, but was not listed in ballot.

Campaign
Feiglin wishes to restore Jewish values and fight secularism and socialism. He wants to end all US aid to Israel and cancel the Oslo Accords. He accused Netanyahu of lying about Jewish settlement in the West Bank. Feiglin has worked to rally support from Likud voters in the West Bank, warning that Netanyahu will "turn left" and freeze construction again. Feiglin hopes to get at least 20% in the primaries, although he received 24% during the last primaries. Netanyahu has said to his campaign that Feiglin must not get over 20%.

Feiglin was mentioned by supporters of Ron Paul, a candidate for the Republican nomination for President of the United States, responding to claims that Paul is anti-Israel due to his opposition to foreign aid. Feiglin refused to endorse any candidate, saying he does not like when Americans interfere in Israeli politics. However, he said he agrees with Ron Paul on foreign aid, and with Newt Gingrich on the historical status of Palestinians.

He said Israel should have attacked Iran's nuclear program long ago, and that would be his first act in office.

On 3 January 2012, Feiglin launched his campaign with hundreds of supporters at the Ramada Renaissance Hotel in Jerusalem, and outlined his platform. He would "keep the entire Land of Israel, build throughout the land, expel enemies and infiltrators, and go up to the Temple Mount to sacrifice the Paschal Lamb". In addition, he would appoint a Likud defense minister, criticizing Netanyahu for maintaining former Labor leader Ehud Barak, properly equip soldiers for missions, demand that [U.S. President] Obama release Jonathan Pollard, and prevent a Meretz take-over of the Supreme Court. Supporters were encouraged to promote the candidacy of Feiglin and convince Likud voters to vote for him.

A poll released on 16 January 2012 by Ma’agar Mochot showed Netanyahu leading Feiglin 51% to 35%, with 14% of Likud members undecided.

Netanyahu defeated Feiglin, winning 77% of the vote. Feiglin's campaign accused Netanyahu supporters of preventing voters from voting. Analysts have said that Netanyahu's inability to win 80% is a failure.

In addition, serious allegations of vote-fixing were raised, indicating that Feiglin may have won a significantly higher percentage of the vote. These allegations were never followed up with a formal complaint, as they would not have resulted in a victory for Feiglin.

Polling

Results
Turnout stood at 50.4%

See also
 2013 Israeli legislative election
 2012 Kadima leadership election
 2014 Likud leadership election
 2019 Likud leadership election

References

External links
 Feiglin campaign website 
 Netanyahu campaign website 

2012 elections in Israel
January 2012 events in Asia
Likud leadership elections
Benjamin Netanyahu
Likud leadership election